Azerbaijan Football Academy is the youth academy of Association of Football Federations of Azerbaijan. It provides a stepping stone for youngsters to progress to the highest levels of football at Azerbaijan. The academy was officially opened on 23 February 2009 by UEFA vice president Şenes Erzik. The Academy is also visited by former Spain's captain Fernando Hierro.

Structure
The facility includes some of the finest training facilities, and features grass pitches on three plateaus, along with an additional floodlit synthetic pitch and specialist training areas for fitness work and goalkeepers. It also includes following:

Gym
Synthetic indoor training pitch
Hydrotherapy pools
Spa
Sauna
Physiotherapy rooms
Media centre

Staff
 Under 15 team coach:  Irfan Saraoglu

Notable academy players

References

External links
 Azerbaijan Football Federations Association Official Website

Football academies in Europe
Football in Azerbaijan
Association of Football Federations of Azerbaijan
2009 establishments in Azerbaijan
Association football training grounds in Azerbaijan
National football academies